Krotoszyn may refer to the following places:
Krotoszyn in Greater Poland Voivodeship (west-central Poland)
Krotoszyn, Radziejów County in Kuyavian-Pomeranian Voivodeship (north-central Poland)
Krotoszyn, Żnin County in Kuyavian-Pomeranian Voivodeship (north-central Poland)